Philopedon is a genus of broad-nosed weevils in the beetle family Curculionidae. There are about seven described species in Philopedon.

Species
These seven species belong to the genus Philopedon:
 Philopedon consentaneum (Desbrochers des Loges, 1907) c g
 Philopedon depilatum (Desbrochers des Loges, 1904) c g
 Philopedon espagnoli Viedma, 1965 c g
 Philopedon lasierrae Viedma, 1965 c g
 Philopedon plagiatum (Schaller, 1783) i c g b (marram weevil)
 Philopedon tuniseum (Desbrochers des Loges, 1908) c g
 Philopedon vicinum (Desbrochers des Loges, 1875) c g
Data sources: i = ITIS, c = Catalogue of Life, g = GBIF, b = Bugguide.net

References

Further reading

External links

 

Entiminae
Articles created by Qbugbot